The Football League Trophy 1997–98, known as the Auto Windscreens Shield 1997–98 for sponsorship reasons, was the 15th staging of the Football League Trophy, a knock-out competition for English football clubs in Second and Third Division. The winners were Grimsby Town and the runners-up were AFC Bournemouth.

The competition began on 6 December 1997 and ended with the final on 19 April 1998 at the Wembley Stadium.

In the first round, there were two sections: North and South. In the following rounds each section gradually eliminates teams in knock-out fashion until each has a winning finalist. At this point, the two winning finalists face each other in the combined final for the honour of the trophy.

First round
Blackpool, Burnley, Macclesfield Town, Mansfield Town, Notts County, Rotherham United, Wrexham and York City from the North section all received byes.

Brentford, AFC Bournemouth, Brighton & Hove Albion, Bristol City, Exeter City, Luton Town, Swansea City and Torquay United from the South section all received byes.

Northern Section

Southern Section

Second round

Northern Section

Southern Section

Quarter-finals

Northern Section

Southern Section

Area semi-finals

Northern Section

Southern Section

Area finals

Northern Area final

Grimsby Town beat Burnley 3–1 on aggregate.

Southern Area final

AFC Bournemouth beat Walsall 4–3 on aggregate.

Final

Notes

External links
Official website
 

EFL Trophy
Tro
1997–98 domestic association football cups